Laion Ferreira Gomes (born February 4, 1988 in Florianópolis), or simply Laion, is a Brazilian right back. He currently plays for Figueirense.

Contract
17 April 2006 to 14 April 2009

External links

Guardian Stats Centre
CBF 
zerozero.pt 
globoesporte 
figueirense.com 

1988 births
Living people
Brazilian footballers
Figueirense FC players
Association football defenders
Sportspeople from Florianópolis